Bad Liebenwerda is a spa town in the Elbe-Elster district, in southwestern Brandenburg, Germany. It is situated on the river Schwarze Elster, 57 km northwest of Dresden, and 28 km east of Torgau.

History 
The first written mention is from the Lievenwerde in 1231. The meaning of the name is Live, or Lieb for life or lovely, and -werde from werda meaning island, high place in water. The document mentions an Otto of Ileburg, Vogt of Lievenwerde, and Plebanus Walterus, a priest.

Liebenwerda has a moated castle with a keep known as the Lubwartturm. The first mention as Liebenwerda as a city is from 1304. Liebenwerda was part of the Electorate of Saxony and Kingdom of Saxony until 1815; as a result of the Congress of Vienna the area became a district in the Kingdom of Prussia. The town has had a health spa since 1905, and in 1925 the word Bad was prefixed to its name. From 1952 to 1990, Bad Liebenwerda was part of the Bezirk Cottbus of East Germany.

Demography

Culture and architecture 
Bad Liebenwerda is home of the Gothic church of St. Nikolai. The tower of the church was rebuilt at the end of the 19th century after lightning struck the tower and caused a fire. The Lubwartturm, a tower was built around 1207 as part of the moated castle, is the oldest building in town. Next to this tower is the museum with an exhibition on the composer Carl Heinrich Graun and his brothers. Also is there an exhibition on Marionettes, other puppets and puppeteers of south-east Germany.

Sons and daughters of the town 
Gotthard Fritzsche (1797-1863), theologian and founder of the Evangelical Lutheran Church in Australia
Ernst Theodor Echtermeyer (1805-1844), philosopher and philologist
Ernst Eberhard (1843-1909), popular science writer
Erich Müller (1897-1980), writer

References

External links

Localities in Elbe-Elster
Spa towns in Germany